The rate of a chemical reaction is influenced by many different factors, such as temperature, pH, reactant, and product concentrations and other effectors. The degree to which these factors change the reaction rate is described by the elasticity coefficient. This coefficient is defined as follows:

 

where  denotes the reaction rate and  denotes the substrate concentration.

The partial derivative in the definition indicates that the elasticity is measured with respect to changes in a factor S while keeping all other factors constant. The most common factors include substrates, products, and effectors. The scaling of the coefficient ensures that it is dimensionless and independent of the units used to measure the reaction rate and magnitude of the factor. The elasticity coefficient is an integral part of metabolic control analysis and was introduced in the early 1970s and possibly earlier by Henrik Kacser and Burns in Edinburgh and Heinrich and Rapoport in Berlin.

The elasticity concept has also been described by other authors, most notably Savageau in Michigan and Clarke at Edmonton. In the late 1960s Michael Savageau developed an innovative approach called biochemical systems theory that uses power-law expansions to approximate the nonlinearities in biochemical kinetics. The theory is very similar to metabolic control analysis and has been very successfully and extensively used to study the properties of different feedback and other regulatory structures in cellular networks. The power-law expansions used in the analysis invoke coefficients called kinetic orders, which are equivalent to the elasticity coefficients.

Bruce Clarke in the early 1970s, developed a sophisticated theory on analyzing the dynamic stability in chemical networks. As part of his analysis, Clarke also introduced the notion of kinetic orders and a power-law approximation that was somewhat similar to Savageau's power-law expansions. Clarke's approach relied heavily on certain structural characteristics of networks, called extreme currents (also called elementary modes in biochemical systems).  Clarke's kinetic orders are also equivalent to elasticities.

Elasticities can also be usefully interpreted as the means by which signals propagate up or down a given pathway.

The fact that different groups independently introduced the same concept implies that elasticities, or their equivalent, kinetic orders, are most likely a fundamental concept in the analysis of complex biochemical or chemical systems.

Calculating elasticity coefficients 

Elasticity coefficients can be calculated either algebraically or by numerical means.

Algebraic calculation of elasticity coefficients 

Given the definition of the elasticity coefficient in terms of a partial derivative, it is possible, for example, to determine the elasticity of an arbitrary rate law by differentiating the rate law by the independent variable and scaling. For example, the elasticity coefficient for a mass-action rate law such as:

 

 

That is, the elasticity for a mass-action rate law is equal to the order of reaction of the species.

For example the elasticity of A in the reaction  where the rate of reaction is given by: , the elasticity can be evaluated using:

Elasticities can also be derived for more complex rate laws such as the Michaelis–Menten rate law. If

 

then it can be easily shown than

 

This equation illustrates the idea that elasticities need not be constants (as with mass-action laws) but can be a function of the reactant concentration. In this case, the elasticity approaches unity at low reactant concentration (s) and zero at high reactant concentration.

For the reversible Michaelis–Menten rate law:

 

where  is the forward ,  the forward ,  the equilibrium constant  and  the reverse , two elasticity coefficients can be calculated, one with respect to substrate, S, and another with respect to product, P. Thus:

 

 

Note that when p = 0, the equations reduce to the case for the irreversible Michaelis–Menten law.

As a final example, consider the Hill equation:

 

Michaelis–Menten rate law), then the elasticity coefficient is given by:

 

Note that at low  concentrations of S the elasticity approaches n. At high concentrations of S the elasticity approaches zero. This means the elasticity is bounded between zero and the Hill coefficient.

Numerical calculation of elasticity coefficients 

Elasticities coefficient can also be computed numerically, something that is often done in simulation software.

For example, a small change (say 5%) can be made to the chosen reactant concentration, and the change in the reaction rate recorded.

One perturbation to increase  and another to decrease . In each case, the new reaction rate is recorded; this is called the two-point estimation method. For example, if  is the reaction rate
we can use the following two-point formula to estimate the elasticity:

Interpretation of the log form 

The proportional change, however, is given by:

The rate of proportional change at the point  is given by the above expression divided by the step change in the  value, namely :

Rate of proportional change 

Using calculus, we know that

,

therefore the rate of proportional change equals:

This quantity serves as a measure of the rate of proportional change of the function . Just as  measures the gradient of the curve  plotted on a linear scale,  measures the slope of the curve when plotted on a semi-logarithmic scale, that is the rate of proportional change.

The same argument can be applied to the case when we plot a function on both  and  logarithmic scales. In such a case, the following result is true:

Differentiating in log space

An approach that is amenable to algebraic calculation by computer algebra methods is to differentiate in log space. Since the elasticity can be defined logarithmically, that is:

 

differentiating in log space is an obvious approach. Logarithmic differentiation is particularly convenient in algebra software such as Mathematica or Maple, where logarithmic differentiation rules can be defined.

Elasticity matrix 

The unscaled elasticities can be depicted in matrix form, called the unscaled elasticity matrix, . Given a network with  molecular species and  reactions, the unscaled elasticity matrix is defined as:

 

Likewise, is it also possible to define the matrix of scaled elasticities:

See also

 Control coefficient (biochemistry) 
 Metabolic control analysis

References

Further reading 

Chemical kinetics
Biochemistry methods
Metabolism
Mathematical and theoretical biology
Systems biology